Wazn (pl. awzān, أوزان literally "measure") may refer to:

 A pattern or cycle of rhythm in Arabian music
 The traditional Arabic name for the star Beta Columbae
 WAZN, an AM radio station licensed in Watertown, Massachusetts and broadcasting from Lexington, Massachusetts at 1470 kHz